Oxytropis pilosa is a species of flowering plant in the legume family and the Faboideae subfamily, found in Central Europe and Eastern Europe as far as Russia. It is a rare and protected plant, and flowers from June to August.

pilosa